Basler Verkehrs-Betriebe (BVB)  is a public transport operator in the Swiss city of Basel, and is wholly owned by canton of Basel-Stadt, which consists of city of Basel and the municipalities of Bettingen and Riehen. The BVB was founded in 1895, and became a self-governing public corporation on 1 January 2006. It transports 132 million passengers per year, an average of roughly 360,000 a day. It operates 128 motor trams and 74 trailers on 9 tram routes, as well as 99 buses on a total of 13 bus routes. These are kept operating by 1200 employees.
BVB jointly operates the Basel tram network with Baselland Transport AG (BLT), owned by the adjoining canton of Basel-Land. Whilst the green colored BVB tends to operate the shorter urban services, its tram routes do extend beyond the inner city into Basel-Land and parts of the German city of Weil am Rhein. Likewise the yellow BLT trams operate into the city centre. Both are part of the integrated fare network Tarifverbund Nordwestschweiz (TNW), which in itself is part of the three countries-integrated fare network triregio.

History

Heinrich Imhoff is the pioneer of the Basler tramways who in 1880 obtained the concession from the local Government in Basel to operate a horse pulled so-called "Tramomnibus".  On 11 July 1881, a horse-drawn omnibus, popularly known as the "Rösslitram", began to operate. According to a fixed timetable, it connected the Badischer Bahnhof (which at that time stood at today's Messeplatz) with the Centralbahnhof (today's SBB railway station) crossing the Rhine over the Middle Bridge every 20 minutes. There were six coaches and forty-two horses in service. The journey from station to station took 22 minutes. The Rösslitram ran without rails like a normal carriage on the road. The carriages were pulled by two horses, and a third horse had to be harnessed for each ascent on the Steinenberg. The operators were often negotiating for a better concession from the city of Basel and in 1892 the city council of Basel decided to built an own tramway.

Tramway 
The tramway was built between 1892 and 1895. In April 1895 the electrified Tramway drove for the first time and in May the same year it was inaugurated to the public. In the first year, the nre company transported 2,7 million or three times more passengers than the former Tramomnibusoperator in the former year.

Expansion 
In April 1896 the city council decides the expansion of the tramways and by 1897 additional lines were taken into service. Until 1908 lines to Riehen, Birsfelden and Allschwil among others were operated. In 1995 the tramway network accounted to 53 kilometers.

Employees 
The tramway began its operation in 1895 with 43 employees of which all were men and thanks to interventions by the social democratic politician Eugen Wullschleger, the new state company hired several employees of the private "Tramomnibus" operator. As in 1939, 320 men had to enter military service due to World War II, there was suddenly a lack of employees. Following also women were recruited. The employees were organized in a workers union of the tramway employees since 1897. In 1930s the employees have an own choir and also a football club.

Buslines 
In 1930, Buslines to Bettingen and the Cemetery of Basel were taken into service. The busnet continuously expanded through the 1950sand 60s until by 1995 having surpassed even the extension of the tramway network. The Basel trolleybus system, which has been replaced by gas-driven buses in 2008, was also operated by BVB. Today, Basel has the largest tramway in terms of kilometers of rail tracks in Switzerland. Historically, only Geneva had a larger one at some point.

References

External links
 
 TNW-wide integrated online-timetable
 TNW Tarifverbund Nordwestschweiz (fare network North-West Switzerland, only in German)
 triregio (three-countries fare network triregio, only in German or French)
 Baselland Transport AG BLT

Tram transport in Switzerland
Transport in Basel
Swiss companies established in 1894
Transport companies established in 1894